Perry Lang (born December 24, 1959, Palo Alto, California) is an American director, writer and actor.

Acting
Lang has appeared in several films and television shows, such as Teen Lust, and directed himself in Men of War (1994). He had roles in Alligator (1980), Eight Men Out (1988) and Sunshine State (2002) — all written and directed by John Sayles. He also appeared in 1941 (1979), The Big Red One (1980), The Hearse (1980), Cattle Annie and Little Britches (1981), Body and Soul (1981), Tag: The Assassination Game (1982), O'Hara's Wife (1982), Spring Break (1983), Sahara (1983), Jocks (1987) and Jennifer 8 (1992).

Directing
He has directed episodes of television series such as Arli$$, ER, Millennium, Dawson's Creek, NYPD Blue, Nash Bridges, Fantasy Island, Weeds, Gilmore Girls, Army Wives, The Twilight Zone, Alias, Las Vegas, Jack & Bobby, Everwood, and Greek. He also directed himself in Men of War (1994).

Family
He is married to former actress Sage Parker-Lang, with whom he has two children.

Film

Television

References

External links

1959 births
Male actors from Palo Alto, California
American male film actors
American male television actors
American television directors
American television writers
American male television writers
Living people
Writers from Palo Alto, California
Film directors from California
20th-century American male actors
21st-century American male actors
Screenwriters from California